Dane or Danes may refer to:

People

Pertaining to Denmark
 Dane, somebody from Denmark
 Danes, an ethnic group native to Denmark
 Danes (tribe), an ancient North Germanic tribe

Other people
 Dane (name), a surname and a given name (and a list of people with the name)
 Danes (surname), a surname
 The Danes, a term used in some Anglo-Saxon sources when referring to the Vikings

Places
 Dane, Ontario, Canada
 Dane, Loška Dolina, Slovenia
 Dane County, Wisconsin, United States
 Dane (town), Wisconsin, a town in Dane County
 Dane, Wisconsin, a village in the town
 River Dane, a river mainly in Cheshire in northwest England
 Daneș, a commune in Mureș County, Romania

DANE
 Departamento Administrativo Nacional de Estadística of Colombia
 DNS-based Authentication of Named Entities, a computer network security protocol

See also
 Great Dane, a breed of dog
 East Danes, an Anglo-Saxon ethnonym used in the epic Beowulf
 Danish (disambiguation)